Palamuru University is a public university situated in Mahbubnagar in Telangana.

See also
 List of universities in India
 List of institutions of higher education in Telangana

References

External links

Mahbubnagar district
Educational institutions established in 2008

2008 establishments in Andhra Pradesh
State universities in Telangana